Michel Van Aerde (2 October 1933 – 11 August 2020) was a Belgian professional road bicycle racer. Van Aerde became national champion in 1961, and won two stages in the Tour de France, in 1960 and 1961.

Van Aerde was born in Zonnegem, and died on 11 August 2020, aged 86.

Major results

1954
 National Militaries road race Championship
1955
Beveren-Waas
1956
Melsele
Stadsprijs Geraardsbergen
Eke
Schoonaarde
1957
Paris - Valenciennes
Stadsprijs Geraardsbergen
Drielandentrofee
Erpe
1958
Beervelde
Wervik
1959
København
Sint-Lievens-Esse
1960
Tour de France:
Winner stage 15
1961
Omloop der drie Proviniciën
Heule
Erembodegem
 Belgian National Road Race Championships
Zonnegem
Tour de France:
Winner stage 12
1963
Burst
1964
Erpe

References

External links 

Official Tour de France results for Michel Van Aerde

Belgian male cyclists
1933 births
2020 deaths
Belgian Tour de France stage winners
People from Sint-Lievens-Houtem
Cyclists from East Flanders